The 1952 Tennessee gubernatorial election was held on November 4, 1952. Democratic nominee Frank G. Clement defeated Republican nominee R. Beecher Witt with 79.37% of the vote.

Primary elections
Primary elections were held on August 7, 1952.

Democratic primary

Candidates
Frank G. Clement, attorney
Gordon Browning, incumbent Governor
Clifford Allen, State Senator
Clifford Pierce

Results

General election

Candidates
Frank G. Clement, Democratic
R. Beecher Witt, Republican

Results

References

1952
Tennessee
Gubernatorial